The 2022 NCAA Division I women's soccer season is the 41st season of NCAA championship women's college soccer.

The season began on August 18, 2022, and will conclude in November.  It will culminate with the 2022 NCAA Division I women's soccer tournament, with the College Cup being held at WakeMed Soccer Park in Cary, North Carolina.

Florida State are the defending NCAA Champions.

Changes from 2021

Rule changes 
In April 2022, during a meeting among the NCAA Playing Rules Oversight Panel (PROP), several major rule changes were enacted. This included overtime, expansion of video assistant referee (VAR), and the appeals process of a suspension.

Specifically overtime was abolished during the regular season. Matches that ended in a draw during a conference or national tournament match would involve two, ten minute periods, without a golden goal. A playoff game tied after two overtime periods would still move to a penalty kick shoot-out with the winner determined by the teams alternating kicks from the penalty mark. Additionally PROP approved VAR to be used for fouls that occurred outside of the penalty area, as well as allowing a 48-hour period to appeal a red card decision.

Coaching changes 

So far, there have been 55 coaching changes during the 2021–22 offseason.

New programs 
Tarleton State University, already a new member of the Western Athletic Conference (WAC) on its first year of reclassification to NCAA Division I, announced on January 19, 2021, that it would add women's soccer starting this season.

Conference realignment

Other headlines 
 August 12 – The Indiana University and Purdue University systems announced that Indiana University–Purdue University Indianapolis will be dissolved in 2024 and replaced by separate IU- and Purdue-affiliated institutions. The current athletic program, the IUPUI Jaguars, will transfer to the new IU Indianapolis.
 August 31 – The Division I Board of Directors adopted a series of changes to transfer rules.
 Transfer windows were adopted for all Division I sports. Student-athletes who wish to be immediately eligible at their next school must enter the NCAA transfer portal within the designated period(s) for their sport. For women's soccer, two windows were established—a 45-day winter window starting the day after the NCAA tournament selections are announced, and a spring window from May 1–15.
 Student-athletes who experience head coaching changes, or those whose athletic aid is reduced, canceled, or not renewed, may transfer outside designated windows without penalty.
 Transferring student-athletes will be guaranteed their financial aid at their next school through graduation.
 September 21 – Houston Baptist University announced it had changed its name to Houston Christian University, effective immediately. The athletic nickname of Huskies was not affected.
 October 14 – Conference USA announced that ASUN Conference member Kennesaw State would join C-USA in 2024.

Season outlook

Preseason polls

Regular season

Major upsets 
In this list, a "major upset" is defined as a game won by a team ranked 10 or more spots lower or an unranked team that defeats a team ranked No. 15 or higher.

All rankings are from the United Soccer Coaches Poll.

Conference standings

Conference winners and tournaments

Postseason

NCAA Tournament

Final rankings

Award winners

All-America teams

Major player of the year awards 
 Hermann Trophy: Michelle Cooper, Duke
 TopDrawerSoccer.com National Player of the Year Award: Korbin Albert, Notre Dame

Other major awards 
 United Soccer Coaches College Coach of the Year: Margueritte Aozasa, UCLA
 Bill Jeffrey Award: 
 Jerry Yeagley Award: Kristin Acquavella
 Mike Berticelli Award: Felicity Day
 NCAA Tournament MVP: Offensive: Reilyn Turner Defensive: Lilly Reale

See also 
 College soccer
 List of NCAA Division I women's soccer programs
 2022 in American soccer
 2022 NCAA Division I Women's Soccer Tournament
 2022 NCAA Division I men's soccer season

References 

 
NCAA